James Williamson (1814 – 22 March 1888) was a 19th-century Member of Parliament, merchant and land speculator in the Auckland Region, New Zealand.

Biography
Williamson was born in Belfast, Ireland, probably in 1814. His parents were Ann Gardiner and Thomas Williamson, who owned ships and was a linen merchant.  James Williamson started going to sea at a young age on his father's ships.  He went to the Bay of Islands in 1840 and settled in Russell, New Zealand.

He represented the Auckland West electorate from 1862 to 1867, when he resigned.

He was then appointed to the Legislative Council in 1870 and remained a member until his death in 1888.

He was a successful businessman and was a co-founder of the New Zealand Insurance Company (1859), the Bank of New Zealand (1861), and the New Zealand Loan and Mercantile Agency Company (1865). In 1877 he built the Pah Homestead (or The Pah) a historic stately home on Pah Farm a 313-acre estate located in the Auckland suburb of Hillsborough. He became insolvent during the fall of value of rural land in the 1880s, and his was the most spectacular failure of the successful Auckland businessmen.

References

1814 births
1888 deaths
Members of the New Zealand House of Representatives
Members of the New Zealand Legislative Council
People from the Auckland Region
New Zealand MPs for Auckland electorates
Politicians from Belfast
Irish emigrants to New Zealand (before 1923)
New Zealand business executives
19th-century New Zealand politicians